Peter Frampton is a British Oscar-winning makeup artist who won at the 1995 Academy Awards for Best Makeup for the film Braveheart, which he shared with Lois Burwell and Paul Pattison.

Selected filmography
Braveheart (1995)
The Commitments (1991)
Henry V (1989)
Withnail & I (1987)
Sid and Nancy (1986)
Greystoke: The Legend of Tarzan, Lord of the Apes (1984)
Pink Floyd The Wall (1982)
Victor Victoria (1982)
Raw Meat (1972)

References

External links

Best Makeup Academy Award winners
Best Makeup BAFTA Award winners
Living people
Year of birth missing (living people)
Film people from London
British make-up artists